WERA-LP is a Variety formatted broadcast radio station licensed to Arlington, Virginia, serving Arlington and Alexandria in Virginia and Washington, D.C.  WERA-LP is owned and operated by Arlington Independent Media, the nonprofit that created the radio station.

The station is staffed by volunteer disc jockeys. Members of Arlington Independent Media are allowed to host and create their own shows, live or recorded, provided they have taken the appropriate classes and follow certain guidelines.

See also
List of community radio stations in the United States

References

External links
 WERA Online
 

2015 establishments in Virginia
Variety radio stations in the United States
Radio stations established in 2015
ERA-LP
ERA-LP
Community radio stations in the United States